Matthew Christopher Hurt (born April 20, 2000) is an American professional basketball player for the Memphis Hustle of the NBA G League. He played college basketball for the Duke Blue Devils.

High school career
Hurt attended John Marshall High School in Rochester, Minnesota for four years. As a freshman in 2015–16, helped his team to a 26–4 record. As a sophomore in 2016–17, helped his team to a 25–4 record. As a junior in 2017–18, averaged 33.9 points, 15.1 rebounds, 3.6 assists, and 4.3 blocks to help his team to a 26–3 record and the section title game. Hurt averaged 17.0 points, 7.0 rebounds, and 1.0 blocks per game on the Adidas Guantlet Circuit for his AAU team, D1 Minnesota. As a senior, Hurt averaged 36.8 points, 12.4 rebounds, and 5.0 assist per game and was named Minnesota Mr. Basketball. Hurt played in the 2019 McDonald's All-American Boys Game and Nike Hoop Summit.

Recruiting
On April 19, 2019, Hurt committed to Duke University, choosing Duke over other offers from North Carolina, Kentucky, and Kansas.

Hurt was rated as a five-star recruit and considered one of the best high school prospects in the 2019 class. Hurt was ranked the No. 10 overall recruit and No. 2 power forward in the 2019 high school class.

College career

Freshman season (2019–2020)
On November 13, Hurt scored 19 points, 3 assist, and 2 blocks in a 105–54 blowout win against Central Arkansas. On November 29, Hurt notched a career high 20 points and 8 rebounds in a 83–70 victory over Winthrop. On December 31, Hurt scored a new career-high 25 points and 4 rebounds in a 88–49 win over Boston College.  For the season, he averaged 9.7 points and 3.8 rebounds in 31 games with 22 starts.

Sophomore season (2020–2021)
Before the start of his sophomore season, Hurt was named to preseason watch lists for the John R. Wooden Award, Naismith Trophy, and Karl Malone Award. On December 16, 2020, Hurt scored 18 points in a 75–65 win over Notre Dame. On January 9, 2021, Hurt scored 26 points and 6 rebounds in a 79–68 victory against Wake Forest. On January 11, 2021, Hurt was named ACC Player of the week. On February 13, 2021, Hurt scored 24 points in a 69–53 win over NC State. On February 17, 2021, Hurt put up 22 points in a 84–60 victory against Wake Forest. On February 20, 2021, Hurt scored 22 points in a 66–65 win over Virginia. On February 22, 2021, Hurt was named Atlantic Coast Conference Player of the week for the second consecutive time. At the conclusion of the regular season, Hurt averaged 18.3 points and 6.1 rebounds per game and was named  ACC Most Improved Player and First-Team All-ACC. 

After the conclusion of his sophomore season, Hurt would forgo his final two years at Duke and enter the 2021 NBA draft.

Professional career

Memphis Hustle (2021–present)
After going undrafted in the 2021 NBA draft, Hurt signed a two-way contract with the Houston Rockets on August 13, 2021, splitting time with their G League affiliate, the Rio Grande Valley Vipers. However, he was waived on September 24, before training camp. On October 14, Hurt signed with the Memphis Grizzlies, but was waived two days later. On October 23, he signed with the Memphis Hustle as an affiliate player.

National team career
Hurt played for the United States under-18 basketball team at the 2018 FIBA Under-18 Americas Championship. He helped his team win the gold medal.

Career statistics

College

|-
| style="text-align:left;"| 2019–20
| style="text-align:left;"| Duke
| 31 || 22 || 20.5 || .487 || .393 || .741 || 3.8 || .9 || .5 || .7 || 9.7
|-
| style="text-align:left;"| 2020–21
| style="text-align:left;"| Duke
| 24 || 23 || 32.7 || .556 || .444 || .724 || 6.1 || 1.4 || .7 || .7 || 18.3
|- class="sortbottom"
| style="text-align:center;" colspan="2"| Career
| 55 || 45 || 25.8 || .526 || .421 || .731 || 4.8 || 1.1 || .6 || .7 || 13.5

Personal life
Hurt's older brother Michael played college basketball for Minnesota.

References

External links
Duke Blue Devils bio
USA Basketball bio

2000 births
Living people
American men's basketball players
Basketball players from Minnesota
Duke Blue Devils men's basketball players
McDonald's High School All-Americans
Memphis Hustle players
Power forwards (basketball)
Sportspeople from Rochester, Minnesota